
Soulfuric Recordings is an independent house-music record label owned by Marc Pomeroy and Brian Tappert. It releases soulful house records worldwide and is the owner of music download site Traxsource.com.

In 2017 Soulfuric was sold to Defected Ltd.

Artists
Artists signed to the label include Off the Cuff and Sandy Turnbull

See also 
 List of house artists
 List of record labels

References

External links
Soulfuric home page
Traxsource.com
Brian Tappert, the Scene

American record labels
House music record labels